General elections were held in Italy on 15 May 1921. It was the first election in which the recently acquired regions of Trentino-Alto Adige, Venezia Giulia, Zara and Lagosta island elected deputies, many of whom were from the Germanic and South Slavic ethnic groups.

Background 
From 1919 to 1920, Italy was shocked by a period of intense social conflict following the First World War known as the Biennio Rosso (Red Biennium). The revolutionary period was followed by the violent reaction of the Fascist Blackshirt militia and eventually by the March on Rome of Benito Mussolini in 1922.

The Biennio Rosso took place in a context of economic crisis at the end of the war, with high unemployment and political instability. It was characterized by mass strikes, worker manifestations as well as self-management experiments through land and factories occupations. In Turin and Milan, workers councils were formed and many factory occupations took place under the leadership of anarcho-syndicalists. The agitations also extended to the agricultural areas of the Po Valley and were accompanied by peasant strikes, rural unrests and guerrilla conflicts between left-wing and right-wing militias.

In the general election of 1921, the Liberal governing coalition, strengthened by the joining of Fascist candidates in the National Bloc (33 of whom were elected deputies), came short of a majority. The Italian Socialist Party, weakened by the split of the Communist Party of Italy, lost many votes and seats, while the Italian People's Party was steady around 20%. The Socialists were stronger in Lombardy (41.9%), than in their historical strongholds of Piedmont (28.6%), Emilia-Romagna (33.4%) and Tuscany (31.0%), due to the presence of the Communists (11.9, 5.2 and 10.5%), while the Populars were confirmed the largest party of Veneto (36.5%) and the Liberal parties in most Southern regions.

Parties and leaders

Results

Deputies elected by region

References

General elections in Italy
Italy
General
Italy